{{Infobox song
| name       = I Honestly Love You
| image      = I Love You, I Honestly Love You by Olivia Newton-John Australian single.png
| caption    = One of side-A labels of the Australian single
| type       = single
| artist     = Olivia Newton-John
| album      = Long Live Love (UK)If You Love Me, Let Me Know (US)
| B-side     = Home Ain't Home Anymore
| released   = August 1974 (US)
| recorded   = 1974
| studio     =
| genre      = Soft rock
| length     = 3:40
| label      = EMI
| writer     = Jeff Barry, Peter Allen
| producer   = John Farrar
| prev_title = If You Love Me, Let Me Know
| prev_year  = 1974
| next_title = Have You Never Been Mellow
| next_year  = 1975
| misc       = 

}}

"I Honestly Love You" is a song recorded by Olivia Newton-John released in 1974 on the album Long Live Love in United Kingdom and If You Love Me, Let Me Know in the United States. The song became a worldwide pop hit, her first number-one single in the United States and Canada. The single was first released in Australia as "I Love You, I Honestly Love You", as per its chorus. The song was written by Jeff Barry and Australian singer and composer Peter Allen. The latter recorded it around the same time for his album Continental American.

At the 17th Grammy Awards in 1975, the single won both Record of the Year and Best Pop Vocal Performance, Female. The composition was nominated for Song of the Year but lost to "The Way We Were". British arranger, keyboardist and composer Alan Hawkshaw received the award for Best Arrangement from the American Academy of Arts & Sciences for "I Honestly Love You". He also played on the recording.

In June 2007, VH1 ranked Newton-John's recording at no. 11 in its 40 Most Softsational Soft-Rock Songs list.

In popular culture
A snippet of Lynn Anderson's recording of the song plays over Chief Brody's radio in the second shark attack in Steven Spielberg's 1975 film Jaws, moments before Alex Kitner and Pippet the dog disappear beneath the waves.

It also appears in the musical about Peter Allen's life, The Boy from Oz.

ReceptionRecord World said that it has "delicate, lush production" and commented on "its pure emotive qualities."

Chart performance
The single reached the top three of the Billboard Hot 100 in an unusually fast six weeks, and in its eighth week, the chart dated 5 October 1974, it spent the first of its two weeks at number one. Soon after it was certified gold by the Recording Industry Association of America, having sold one million copies. It also reached number one (three weeks) on the Adult Contemporary chart and no. 6 on the Country chart. The song's success also helped propel its parent album, If You Love Me, Let Me Know, to number one, on the chart dated 12 October 1974. By contrast, the single failed to reach the top 20 in the United Kingdom (no. 22), although it did chart there in 1983 when it was re-released to promote a Newton-John greatest hits album.

The single ranked number 97 on [[Billboard Year-End Hot 100 singles of 1974|Billboard's Year-End Top 100 of 1974]] – a ranking based on only 11 of its 15 weeks on the Hot 100. 

In November 1977, a re-release of Newton-John's original version backed with "Don't Cry for Me Argentina", from her then-current album Making a Good Thing Better, reached number 48 during its nine-week run on the Hot 100; the single outperformed the only A-side single from the album (the title track), which five months earlier had stalled at number 87. The re-release of Newton-John's 1974 hit also re-charted on the Adult Contemporary chart, peaking at number 49.

Charts

Weekly charts

Year-end charts

1998 version

Newton-John re-recorded "I Honestly Love You" for her 1998 album Back with a Heart, with Babyface on background vocals. The new version was released as a single, debuting on the Billboard Hot 100 in May 1998. It was her first song to chart in the Hot 100 for six years, peaking at No. 67 and spent 12 weeks on the chart. It reached No. 18 on the Adult Contemporary chart and No. 16 on the Country Music Sales chart.

Charts

Cover versions

Bobby Vinton on his 1974 album Melodies of LoveAndy Williams on his 1974 album You Lay So Easy on My MindLynn Anderson on her 1974 album What a Man My Man IsRonnie Milsap on his 1975 album A Legend in My TimeKamahl on his 1975 album Let It Be MeJerry Butler on his 1976 album Love's on the MenuBobby Womack on his 1979 album Roads of LifeLeslie Uggams on the 1977 TV special Sinatra and FriendsThe Staple Singers on their 1977 album Family TreeJackie Moore on her 1980 album With Your LoveDonna Fargo on her 1984 album EncoreLea Salonga on her 1993 self titled album
Richard Clayderman on his 1999 album My Australian CollectionJuliana Hatfield on her 2018 album Juliana Hatfield Sings Olivia Newton-John.
 Delta Goodrem in the mini-series Olivia Newton-John: Hopelessly Devoted to You and the accompanying soundtrack album, I Honestly Love You 
Kate Ceberano on her 2021 album Sweet Inspiration''

References 

1974 songs
1974 singles
Songs written by Jeff Barry
Songs written by Peter Allen (musician)
Olivia Newton-John songs
Andy Williams songs
Song recordings produced by John Farrar
Song recordings produced by David Foster
Billboard Hot 100 number-one singles
Cashbox number-one singles
Number-one singles in Australia
RPM Top Singles number-one singles
Grammy Award for Record of the Year
Grammy Award for Best Female Pop Vocal Performance
MCA Records singles
EMI Records singles
1970s ballads
Pop ballads
Rock ballads